Super Fruit Fall is a video game designed by Cheshire-based game developer Nissimo and published by Cheshire-based System 3. Wii, PlayStation 2, and PSP versions of the game were developed by Leamington Spa-based game developer SLAM Productions. A Nintendo DS version was also released.

Gameplay
The object of the game is to get rid of all the fruit by spinning the puzzle frame in order to combine matching fruit into formations or 3 or more before the time runs out.

Release
It was released for Wii in Australia on 7 December 2006, in the UK on 8 December 2006, and in the US it was released on the Nintendo DS on 15 November 2007. It was released for PSP in Europe as Super Fruit Fall Deluxe Edition on 7 July 2007.

Super Fruit Fall was one of two Nintendo Wii launch titles developed by a UK developer.

Reception

The Official Nintendo Magazine, praised the game for the addictiveness throughout the game, but criticized the fact that flicking the Remote and Nunchuk to move the grid feels very pointless, and even stated that while it was addictive, it also didn't have enough value for money, as the game could be downloaded on PC for half the price.

References

Puzzle video games
2006 video games
Nintendo DS games
Wii games
PlayStation Portable games
PlayStation Network games
PlayStation 2 games
Video games developed in the United Kingdom